Admiral Flota Sovetskogo Soyuza Gorshkov is an  frigate of the Russian Navy and the lead ship of the class.

Design
Unlike their Soviet-era predecessors, the new ships are designed for multiple roles. They are to be capable of executing long-range strikes, conducting anti-submarine warfare, and carrying out escort missions.

Construction and career 
The ship was laid down on 1 February 2006, launched on 29 October 2010 and was first expected to join the Russian Navy in November 2013. However, problems with delivery of the main naval gun, engine fire and testing of the ship's Poliment-Redut air defence system delayed the commissioning date several times. She was finally commissioned on 28 July 2018 with Russia's Northern Fleet. The ship is named after Hero of the Soviet Union Sergey Gorshkov. With pennant number 454 (earlier 417), Admiral Gorshkov is part of the 43rd Missile Ship Division at Severomorsk.

On 28 July 2018, Admiral Gorshkov was officially accepted into service with the Russian Navy, the day before her debut at the Main Naval Day parade in Saint Petersburg. In total, the ship performed 16 firing exercises during the entire period of her state trials.

On the maiden distant deployment, Admiral Gorshkov travelled some 35,000 nautical miles in what turned out to be the first global circumnavigation the Russian Navy performed since Stepan Makarov's 1886–1889 voyage on the corvette . Accompanied by medium sea tanker Kama, logistics support vessel Elbrus and large ocean tug Nikolay Chiker, during the historic mission Admiral Gorshkov visited the following ports: Djibouti (Djibouti), Colombo (Sri Lanka), Qingdao (China), Vladivostok (Russia), Puerto Bolívar (Ecuador), Havana (Cuba), Praia (Cape Verde) and Kronstadt (Russia), before returning to her homeport Severomorsk. The 175-day long journey took place between 26 February and 19 August 2019. On her route home, she also participated in the "Ocean Shield 2019" major naval exercise of the Russian Navy held in the Mediterranean Sea, thought to be the largest in the independent Russia with some 70 warships, submarines and auxiliary ships participating.

In early January 2020, Admiral Gorshkov test-launched the 3M22 Zircon hypersonic anti-ship cruise missile from the Barents Sea, as part of the missile's state trials. This was the first time the Zircon was launched from a naval vessel. Additional launches of the Zircon missile took place in October, November and December. All the tests have been successful.

On 19 February 2021, Admiral Gorshkov entered the Barents Sea for exercises. She conducted anti-submarine and air defence exercises along with the tug Altay. On 24 March, the frigate entered the Barents Sea and launched an Onyx missile, being accompanied by icebreaker Ilya Muromets, supply ship Elbrus and tug MB-110, while hydrographic vessels Romuald Muklevich, Nikolay Skosyrev, Aleksandr Makorta and anti-saboteur ship Valeriy Fedyanin were also active in the Barents Sea at the same time.

On 28 May 2022, the Admiral Gorshkov test fired a 3M22 Zircon missile in the Barents Sea at a target in the White Sea.  On 4 June, she was underway in the Barents Sea again conducting helicopter operations. The frigate took part in the parade on the Russian Navy day on 31 July in Saint Petersburg. On the same day, the Russian president Vladimir Putin announced Admiral Gorshkov will be the first ship armed with Zircon missiles. She underwent maintenance in Kronstadt Marine Plant until November and on 23 November conducted firing with the Redut missile complex in the Baltic Sea. On 9 December 2022, she was sailing along the Norwegian coast, finally returning to Severomorsk on 11 December.

In late December 2022, Admiral Gorshkov was preparing to re-enter service in early January 2023 armed with Zircon hypersonic missiles. 

On 4 January 2023, Admiral Gorshkov re-entered service equipped with Zircon hypersonic missiles, and began a voyage that will pass through the Atlantic and Indian Oceans, as well as the Mediterranean Sea. On 
14 February the frigate docked in Cape Town ahead of planned exercises with the Chinese People's Liberation Army Navy and the South African Navy.
The exercise began on 18 February and involved Admiral Gorshkov together with the tanker Kama from the Russian Navy along with the destroyer Huainan, the frigate Rizhao and the support ship Kekexilihu from the Chinese Navy. Several vessels from the South African Navy were expected to participate including the frigate Mendi as well as the Warrior-class patrol vessel King Sekhukhune I and the hydrographic survey vessel SAS Protea. Subsequently in March, Admiral Gorshkov and Kama engaged in joint exercises with the Chinese and Iranian navies in the Gulf of Oman.

References

External links

Admiral Gorshkov-class frigates
Frigates of the Russian Navy
2010 ships
Ships built at Severnaya Verf